Henry Saunders may refer to:
Henry Saunders (politician) (1855–1919), Australian politician
Henry Saunders (cricketer, born 1841) (1841–1904), English cricketer for Cambridgeshire
Henry Saunders (cricketer, born 1883) (1883–1942), English cricketer for Somerset
Henry Saunders (cricketer, born 1966), cricketer who played for the Turks and Caicos Islands
Henry Saunders House, a historic home located near Windsor, Isle of Wight County, Virginia

See also
Harry Saunders (disambiguation)
Hank Saunders, a character on the TV series Glee
Henry Sanders (disambiguation)